The Internet Tax Nondiscrimination Act, is the current U.S. federal law that bans Internet taxes in the United States.  Signed into law on December 3, 2004, by George W. Bush, it extended until 2007 the then-current moratorium on new and discriminatory taxes on the Internet.  It also extended the federal prohibition against state and local Internet access taxes until November 2007. 
 
The law's co-authors were Representative Christopher Cox (R-California) and Senators George Allen (R-Virginia), and Senator Ron Wyden (D-Oregon).

The law was supported by a congressionally sponsored study commission known as the Advisory Commission on Electronic Commerce, which studied Internet taxes in 1999 and 2000.  The Commission was chaired by then-Virginia Governor James S. Gilmore, III, who led a coalition of Commission members to issue a final report opposing taxation of the Internet and eliminating federal telephone taxes, among other ideas. 

On November 1, 2007, President Bush signed the "Internet Tax Freedom Act Amendment Act of 2007" into law.  It extends the prohibitions against multiple and discriminatory taxes on electronic commerce until November 1, 2014. See 47 United States Code Section 151.

See also
 Internet Tax Freedom Act

External links
 47 U.S.C. 151 as Amended (2008)

United States federal taxation legislation
Acts of the 108th United States Congress